Dr. Motahar Hossain was an Indian politician, belonging to the Indian National Congress. Hossain was born in Bhimpur, Birbhum District in May 1932, son of Korban Hossain. He was a medical doctor by profession.

He served as Minister of State for Home in the West Bengal government of Siddhartha Shankar Ray. He died in Kolkata on 20 November 2011.

References

2011 deaths
Indian National Congress politicians from West Bengal
Members of the West Bengal Legislative Assembly
State cabinet ministers of West Bengal
People from Birbhum district